El vampiro   is a 1957 Mexican horror film, produced by Abel Salazar and directed by Fernando Méndez from an original screenplay by Ramon Obon, and starring German Robles as Count Lavud, the vampire, Abel Salazar as Dr. Enrique, and Ariadna Welter as Marta. The film, which took influence from the canon of Universal horror, is seen as the beginning of the Mexican horror boom of the 1960s.

A sequel,  El ataud del vampiro  with the same producer (Salazar), director (Méndez), writer (Obon) and three main actors playing the same roles (Robles, Salazar, and Welter) was released in 1958.

Plot
The film is about Marta, a young woman, who travels to her childhood village, only to find that one of her aunts is dead and another is under the influence of Mr. Duval,  who later turns out to be a vampire named Count Karol de Lavud.

Cast
German Robles as Conde (Count) Karol de Lavud
Ariadne Welter as Marta
Abel Salazar as Dr. Enrique
Carmen Montejo as Eloise
Jose Luis Jimenez as Ambrosio
Alicia Montejo 
Mercedes Soler
Jose Chavez
Julio Daneri
Amado Zumaya
Guillermo Alvarez Bianchi
Margarito Luna
Lydia Mellon

Production
It is one of the first movies to show a vampire with elongated canines, a year before Hammer's Horror of Dracula. Although F.W. Murnau's Nosferatu (Max Schrek) had elongated incisors; Tod Browning's Dracula (Bela Lugosi) did not show his teeth at all, while for this film Robles was given visible teeth.

See also
Vampire films

References

Citations

Bibliography

 Cotter, Robert Michael "Bob" (2005), The Mexican Masked Wrestler and Monster Filmography, McFarland & Co..

External links
 
Tecnológico de Monterrey
DVD Maniacs
Revista Cinefania
DVD Talk
Vampires on the Screen

1957 horror films
1957 films
Mexican horror thriller films
Mexican vampire films
1950s horror thriller films
1950s Spanish-language films
1950s Mexican films